The Kosovo Basketball Superleague (Albanian: Superliga e Kosovës në Basketboll) and known as the ArtMotion Superliga due to sponsorship reasons is the top men's professional basketball league in Kosovo. Basketball Superleague was founded in 1991. It is run by the Basketball Federation of Kosovo.

Prishtina holds the record for most Superleague titles as it has won the championship 14 times.

Current teams

Rules

Competition format
It consists of eight to ten teams which compete each year in two separate phases. Each team has to play all the other teams in its division four times, twice at home and twice away. This means that in Kosovo basketball, the league's regular season ends after all teams play 28 matches.

At the end of the league, the four best teams in the standings start a play-off, pitting the first place team in the standings versus the 4th place team in the standings, and so on. There is one playoff rounds, and the winner of the finals round becomes the champion of the Kosovo Basketball Superleague. This is similar to the most basketball leagues in Europe.

Each season, the last qualified team of the regular season relegates to Kosovo Basketball First League and replaced by champion of the First League whilst second from last of Superleague meats the runner up of the First League in e Relegation Playoff.

Foreigners
Each team can play 3 foreign players in every match that is organized by BFK.

Youngsters
Every team must play two U20 players in every game for at least 20 min otherwise the teams are fined 500 €.

Arena standards
Since the establishment of the league, the indoor courts in Kosovo have seen continuous improvements in capacity and facilities, with some municipalities have built and newly built stadiums for basketball clubs in their areas as well as other sports. Today, the facilities of the clubs participating in Kosovo Basketball Superleague and hosting the home matches, must have a minimum capacity of 1,000 people.

History
Despite the political status of Kosovo, basketball competitions have been legally organized since 1999 under the Basketball Federation of Kosovo licensed by the United Nations Mission in Kosovo and the Government of Kosovo. However, the KBF has functioned since 1991 and organized amateur basketball leagues.

Today, basketball in Kosovo shares the same popularity with football.

Names of the competition
 1999–2004: Liga e Pare e Kosoves ne Basketboll
 2004–2005: Liga Profesionale e Basketbollit te Kosoves
 2005–2007: Raiffeisen Superliga
 2007–2009: Siguria Superliga
 2009–2011: Techno Market Superliga
 2011–2013: BKT Superliga
 2013–2017: ETC Superliga
 2017–2020: IP Superliga
 2020-2021: FiveStar Superliga
 2021-2022: ArtMotion Superliga
 2022–Present: PrinceCaffe Superliga

Gallery

Commissioners
 2006–2011: Nuredin Ibishi
 2013–Present: Bajrush Ademi

Other competitions
Kosovo Cup (basketball)
Balkan International Basketball League
FIBA Europe Cup

Winner by season

Titles by Club

Sponsorships and broadcasting rights
Official sponsors
 IP Petrol
 TEB Bank
 STOBI FLIPS
 Rugove
 Baker Tilly Kosovo
  Gowzillas
  Global CT Digital Kosovo

Official broadcasters
 ArtMotion
 Kujtesa
 Klan Kosova

See also
Kosovo national basketball team
Basketball Federation of Kosovo
Kosovo Cup

References

External links
 Kosovan basketball on Eurobasket
 FanPage

 
Basketball leagues in Kosovo
Basketball leagues in Europe
Sports leagues established in 1991